Helen McGaffey Searles (February 1856 – April 15, 1936) was an American professor, classicist, and women's suffragist. She received her doctorate from the University of Chicago in 1898, and taught Latin at Mount Holyoke College from 1899 until her retirement in 1922.

Life and education
Helen McGaffey Searles was born in February 1856, in Barre, Canada. She received a Master of Arts from Lake Forest College in Illinois in 1894, then received a doctorate in comparative philology from the University of Chicago in 1898. Searles died on April 15, 1936, in South Hadley, Massachusetts.

Academic career and activism
After graduating in 1898, Searles taught for less than one year at the Pennsylvania College for Women before accepting a position teaching Latin at Mount Holyoke College in 1899. She also taught at the Ferry Hall School in Lake Forest, Illinois between 1899 and 1904. During her career as a professor, Searles was active in the women's suffrage movement. She represented Mount Holyoke College at a 1907 meeting of the Boston Equal Suffrage Association, which focused on women's secondary education and featured female representatives from other Boston-area colleges and universities, including other Seven Sisters colleges. Searles retired from Mount Holyoke in 1922, but remained associated with the college and held the title of Professor Emeritus until her death in 1936.

Bibliography
 Searles, Helen M (1898) A lexicographical study of the Greek inscriptions. Studies on Classical Philology: University of Chicago Press

References 

1856 births
1936 deaths
American suffragists
University of Chicago alumni
Lake Forest College alumni
Mount Holyoke College faculty